William Clinton Clark (born April 15, 1988) is an American retired basketball player. He played four seasons collegiate for the Duquesne Dukes men's basketball team. He usually played as small forward.

College career
In the 2010–11 season, Clark was named the best player of the NABC District.

Professional career
Clark played for MBC Mykolaiv in Ukraine during the 2013–14 season.

For the 2014–15 season, he signed with Fos Ouest Provence Basket of the French Pro B.

In January 2015, he signed with Donar of the Dutch DBL. With Donar, he won the NBB Cup.

After playing one more season in France with Caen Basket Calvados and a short stint with Chorale Roanne Basket, Clark retired in 2017.

References

External links
Duquesne bio

1988 births
Living people
American expatriate basketball people in France
American expatriate basketball people in the Netherlands
American expatriate basketball people in Ukraine
American men's basketball players
Basketball players from California
Caen Basket Calvados players
Chorale Roanne Basket players
Donar (basketball club) players
Duquesne Dukes men's basketball players
Dutch Basketball League players
Fos Provence Basket players
MBC Mykolaiv players
Small forwards
Sportspeople from Redondo Beach, California
Worcester Academy alumni